Naworth is a former railway station, which served the hamlet of Naworth in Cumbria. The station served the Tyne Valley Line between 1871 and 1952.

History
The station opened in June 1871 by the Newcastle and Carlisle Railway. It was closed to both passengers and goods traffic on 5 May 1952.

References

External links
 

Disused railway stations in Cumbria
Former North Eastern Railway (UK) stations
Railway stations in Great Britain opened in 1839
Railway stations in Great Britain closed in 1952
1839 establishments in England
1952 disestablishments in England